Tonetti is a surname of Italian origin. Notable people with this surname include:

Given names
 Gianluca Tonetti (born 1967), Italian former road cyclist
 Gino Tonetti (born 1941 or 1942), Italian and American singer
 Kyle Tonetti (born 1987), South African-born Irish rugby union player
 Mary Lawrence Tonetti (1868–1945), American sculptor
 Riccardo Tonetti (born 1989), Italian alpine ski racer

Fictional characters
 Tonetti, a character in The Gay Divorcee

See also

Italian-language surnames

Patronymic surnames